Francisco Viana (1895 – 1945 in Lisbon) was a Portuguese guitarist and composer of fados. He is the originator of the Fado Vianinha style, named after him in distinction from, for example the Fado Marceneiro style of Alfredo Marceneiro.

References

1895 births
1945 deaths
Portuguese fado guitarists
20th-century guitarists